Montparnasse Bienvenue is a 2017 French comedy-drama film written and directed by Léonor Serraille. It was screened in the Un Certain Regard section at the 70th Cannes Film Festival and won the Caméra d'Or (for Léonor Sérraille).

The film stars Lætitia Dosch as Paula, a woman recently returned to Paris after years living abroad, who is forced to forge a new life for herself after being abruptly dumped by her wealthy boyfriend.

Plot
After her wealthy boyfriend Joachim locks her out of their shared apartment, Paula screams to be let back in and is taken to a mental ward. Escaping the ward she returns to Joachim's apartment and discovers he has locked out her cat as well.
 
Having only recently returned from years abroad in Mexico, Paula has no job and few friends. After quickly exhausting what little money she has, and angering her friends, she turns to the mother she ran away from years earlier, only to be quickly rejected. While riding the subway, she meets a woman, Yuki, who mistakes her for a former classmate. Desperate for help, Paula plays along and allows Yuki to buy her groceries in order to help tide her over.

Paula manages to lie her way into a live-in nanny job she has no qualifications for. She also takes a second job working at a lingerie store at the mall where she befriends Osman, a standoffish security guard who warns her that the women at that store never last long.

Just as things begin to settle for Paula, she begins to hit a series of setbacks. As her relationship with Lila, the child she is nannying, begins to warm up, her relationship with Lila's mother grows colder. Lila's mother makes her get rid of her cat, which she gives to Osman for safekeeping. Paula begins to forget about Joachim, but discovers she is pregnant with his child. Despite her precarious financial situation and her lack of a support system, she contemplates keeping the child.

Paula meets Yuki again and brings her back to her home. Yuki accidentally discovers that Paula is not her former classmate and Paula tearfully apologizes and offers to reimburse her for the money she spent on her. Yuki forgives her and the two have sex. Later, learning from Lila that she is on the verge of being fired, she returns to her mother's house, this time refusing to be sent away and finally reconnecting with her.

Joachim, who has not heard from Paula for sometime, tracks her down to her job in the mall where she tells him she is pregnant. They meet for dinner, where Joachim offers to take care of her and their child. After the dinner, she goes to Osman's house to collect her cat and the two kiss.

Later she goes to meet Joachim to tell him she has decided to have an abortion. Joachim attempts to rape Paula but she successfully fights him off. Paula has the abortion and leaves her nannying job.

Cast
 Lætitia Dosch as Paula
 Grégoire Monsaingeon as Joachim
 Souleymane Seye Ndiaye as Osman
 Léonie Simaga as Yuki
 Erika Sainte as Lila's mother
 Lilas-Rose Gilberti-Poisot as Lila
 Audrey Bonnet as doctor
 Nathalie Richard as Paula's mother

Reception
On review aggregator website Rotten Tomatoes, the film holds an approval rating of 97%, based on 38 reviews, and an average rating of 7.65/10. On Metacritic, the film has a weighted average score of 76 out of 100, based on 8 critics, indicating "generally favorable reviews".

References

External links
 

2017 films
2017 comedy-drama films
2017 directorial debut films
2010s French-language films
Caméra d'Or winners
Films set in Paris
Films shot in Paris
French comedy-drama films
2010s French films